Jan Hendrik Weissenbruch, also known as Hendrik Johannes Weissenbruch (born 19 June 1824 in The Hague – died 24 March 1903 in The Hague) was a Dutch painter of the Hague School. He is noted especially for his watercolours.

Biography

Hendrik Johannes  Weissenbruch, also known as Jan Hendrik, was born in The Hague on 19 June 1824, the second son of Johannes Weissenbruch and Johanna Hendrika Zaag. He came from an artistic family. His father Johannes, a chef and restaurateur, painted in his free time and collected art on a small scale. Among Johannes' collection were works by Andreas Schelfhout and Bartholomeus van Hove. Johannes' cousin Jan (1822–80) was a well-known painter of townscapes. Another cousin Frederik Hendrik (1828–87) was a lithographer, while his younger brother Frederik Johan, his uncle Daniel and his nephew Isaac (1826–1912) were all engravers.

When Jan was sixteen years old he received drawing lessons  from Johannes Low. In 1843, he took evening classes taught by Bartholomeus van Hove at the Hague Academy of Art. During the day Weissenbruch worked in Van Hove's studio, together with Johannes Bosboom and Salomon Verveer, helping to make pieces of scenery for the Royal Theatre.

Weissenbruch's early work showed the strong influence of the romantic painter Andreas Schelfhout. Schelfhout's influence can be seen in Weissenbruch's early landscapes, painted in precise detail. His magnificent, cloudy skies show his admiration for the seventeenth-century artist Jacob van Ruisdael, whose work he saw at an early age in the Mauritshuis in The Hague. When he was invited to take lessons from this very celebrated artist, his older friend, Bosboom, advised him not to accept. 'I can't simply say "no, thank you" to Schelfhout!" sputtered Weissenbruch. Whereupon Bosboom said: "you should do that, Weiss! You have to learn to stand on your own and see through your own eyes." In 1847, Weissenbruch first exhibited at the Exhibition of Living Masters, and he became one of the founders of the Pulchri Studio.

In 1849, two years after Weissenbruch staged his first exhibition, the Teylers Museum in Haarlem acquired one of his panoramic landscapes. However, that early success did not last very long. In spite of the prestige he had earned among his colleagues, he did not achieve public acknowledgement until the late 1880s. During this intermediate period, Weissenbruch went from being a characteristic painter of Dutch Romanticism to one of the best representatives of the Hague School. His lively dune landscapes led to a series of atmospheric impressions of the Dutch polders, in which the artist paid special attention to his representation of the cloudy skies with its light and shadows and the dynamics of the permante winds. The contrast from the sky to the water is very important to him, too. Thus he belonged to the Kortenhoef School, one of the followers of the Oosterbeek School. These beautiful oil and watercolour landscapes were painted, almost without exception, with free and delicate brushstrokes.

The sky above the polders began to play a more important role.  His use of color gradually became more restrained and his application of paint increasingly broader and looser.  This made his landscapes more atmospheric, the bearers of light and clouds.  He stressed the importance of both of these elements when he said, "The sky in a painting, that is what is most important! Sky and light are the great magicians. The sky determines what the painting is.  Painters can never pay too much attention to the sky.  We live from light and sunshine, and go with or palette through the dry periods."

Weissenbruch enjoyed working outdoors in the countryside. He usually found his subjects in the area around The Hague where he lived, rarely going far from home. However, in 1900, at the age of seventy, he took a trip to Barbizon where he painted his famous forest scene. The journey to Barbizon must have been a kind of pilgrimage for him, since it was in this area that French painters, in around 1830, had first begun to paint in the open air on a large scale. These 'painters of Barbizon' strove for a natural representation of the landscape, paying particular attention to the mood and the light. Nature for Weissenbruch was also of the utmost importance.

Paintings

Museums with Weissenbruch's paintings

 Historisch Museum, Amsterdam.
 Rijksmuseum Amsterdam.
 Dordrecht Museum, Dortrecht.
 Rijksmuseum Twenthe, Enschede.
 Groninger Museum, Groningen.
 Teyler Museum, Haarlem.
 Gemeentemuseum, Den Haag.
 Museum Mesdag, Den Haag.
 Kasteel het Nijenhuis, Heino (part of Museum de Fundatie).
 Nijmeegs Museum Commanderie van St. Jan, Nijmegen.
 Jan Cunen Museum, Oss.
 Rijksmuseum Kröller—Müller, Otterlo.
 Historisch Museum, Rotterdam.
 Museum Boymans van Beuningen, Rotterdam.

Bibliography
Sillevis, John & Tabak, Anne. The Hague School Book, Waanders Uitgegevers, Zwolle (2004), pp. 229–237
 Leeuw, Ronald de; Sillervis, John and Dumas, Charles (1983): The Hague School: Dutch Masters of the Nineteenth Century, Weidenfeld and Nicolson, London, .
 Wright, Christopher (1980): Paintings in Dutch museum, Philip Wilson Publishers Liumited, London, 
 Denninger-Schreuder, Carole (2003): Schilders van Laren, Thoth – Uitgeverij, .
 Koenraads, Jan P. (1985): Laren en zijn Schilders, Boekhandel Juli Kluvers, .
 De Bodt, Saskia and Sellink, Manfred. Nineteenth Century Dutch Watercolors and Drawings, Museum Boijmans Van Beuningen, Rot
 Haagse Gemeentemuseum, De Haagse School Boek, . Rotterdam, 1998.

References

External links

 Van Gogh letters mentioning Weissenbruch
 biography facts and dates of Jan Hendrik Weissenbruch, in the Dutch R.K.D. Archive, The Hague
 many free images of paintings and drawings by Jan Hendrik Weissenbruch, in the RijksStudio of the Rijksmuseum, Amsterdam 
 'The Art of Johannes Hendrick Weissenbruch' (including some artist-quotes), by E. C. Cady, in 'Brush and Pencil, Volume 12', April 1904; in PDF

Hague School
19th-century Dutch painters
Dutch male painters
Artists from The Hague
1824 births
1903 deaths
19th-century Dutch male artists